Tephritis majuscula is a species of tephritid or fruit flies in the genus Tephritis of the family Tephritidae.

Distribution
Russia, Japan.

References

Tephritinae
Insects described in 1953
Diptera of Asia